Through Silver in Blood is the fifth album from the American avant-garde metal band Neurosis.  The album was released on April 2, 1996, and was their first record to be released through Relapse Records. The album was reissued in July 2009 on the band's own label, Neurot Recordings. Since its release, Through Silver in Blood has been recognized not only as the band's critical and popular peak, but as one of the sources of post-metal and as one of the best metal albums of all time.

Through Silver in Blood was preceded by Tribes of Neurot companion album Silver Blood Transmission (1995) and succeeded by a split EP between the two projects, Locust Star (1996).

Background and composition

Neurosis bassist and vocalist Dave Edwardson described Through Silver in Blood as "more of an epic undertaking than the last one." In keeping with the band's progressively deeper experimentation into extreme metal, the album is notably slow, distorted, and heavy, drawing from influences such as Black Sabbath and Swans. As the band's first album to feature keyboardist Noah Landis, Through Silver in Blood marked a new level of darkness in Neurosis's experimentation.

During the creation of Through Silver in Blood, the band went through a period of difficulty. Scott Kelly, homeless at the time, was struggling with addiction, and Steve Von Till was going through "heavy things". Von Till called the album's creation "a fucking railroad through hell."

Critical reception

Through Silver in Blood has received widespread critical acclaim, with some publications citing it as both one of the first and one of the best post-metal albums. AllMusic writer Eduardo Rivadavia gave the album a perfect score, praising the album's challenging and rewarding nature. Writing for Rolling Stone, Steve Smith called Through Silver in Blood Neurosis's "transformative masterpiece: a titanic mix of hardcore, industrial and sludge-metal notions and sampled soundbites, balancing oppressive heaviness, hypnotic repetition and surprising vulnerability." Fact placed the album as number one on their list of best post-metal releases ever, writing, "This is alien, and can be unpleasant, but that’s the point – this is the spiritual successor to Black Sabbath, the album that started it all." The A.V. Club writer J.J. Anselmi said, "Through Silver in Blood has played an undeniable role in defining post-metal, and its influence reverberates in the sounds of countless bands. But this album inflicts levels of disorientation, fear, and hopelessness that few records have attained in the past 20 years, giving Through Silver in Blood a shelf life that has yet to glimpse an expiration date."

Since its release, Through Silver in Blood has appeared on several publications' best-of lists.

Accolades

Track listing

Personnel
Personnel adapted from Through Silver in Blood liner notes.

Neurosis
 Scott Kelly – guitar, vocals, percussion
 Steve Von Till – guitar, vocals, percussion
 Noah Landis – keyboards, synthesizer, sampling
 Dave Edwardson – bass guitar, backing vocals
 Jason Roeder – drums, percussion
 Pete Inc. – visuals

Technical personnel
 Adam Munoz – engineering assistance
 Mike Johnson – engineering assistance
 Mike Bogus – engineering assistance
 Greg Horn – mastering
 Billy Anderson – production

Additional musicians
 John Goff – bagpipes
 Martha Burns – cello
 Kris Force – violin

References

1996 albums
Neurosis (band) albums
Albums produced by Billy Anderson (producer)